The 14th Rhythmic Gymnastics European Championships were held in Porto, Portugal from 28 May to 31 May 1998.

Medal winners

Medal table

References 

1998 in gymnastics
Rhythmic Gymnastics European Championships